The Knight's Armament Company 6×35mm PDW is an experimental personal defense weapon designed by Knight's Armament Company (KAC), firing a 6mm cartridge optimized for short barrel weapons. A variant chambered in .300 AAC Blackout is also available.

Design 

The KAC's lower receiver, holding the magazine and trigger assembly, is essentially a shortened M16 rifle lower receiver, which makes the basic operating controls familiar to many potential users. However, the cartridge, upper receiver, and operating mechanism are all new designs by KAC.

The KAC PDW uses a completely side-folding stock, unlike the M16 and M4 designs which have their main operating spring in a tube in the stock, and therefore can only partially telescope, and not fold sideways at all, unless specialized hardware is installed.

The KAC PDW has two gas pistons tapping hot gas from the barrel to operate its mechanism, located on the top left and right sides of the bolt carrier.  The single mainspring is located on top, between the two gas pistons.

Ammunition 

The KAC PDW fires a 6×35 mm cartridge, which is over a centimeter shorter than the 5.56×45mm NATO round. The 6mm bullet is slightly wider, and the standard 6×35mm bullet slightly heavier, than the standard 5.56mm bullet ( versus ).

The larger diameter, shorter 6 mm cartridge is optimized for these shorter barrel lengths, and would perform less efficiently from rifle-length barrels. The round's muzzle energy is  versus  for a 5.56 mm bullet, again from the same 10" standard barrel.

History 

The weapon was formally introduced at the 2006 NDIA Small Arms Symposium in Albuquerque, New Mexico. Some writers were shown samples at the earlier 2006 SHOT Show. The only KAC PDWs ordered by the U.S. Government were for the United States Secret Service. They were the only ones to order this weapon.

References

External links
 

Personal defense weapons
ArmaLite AR-10 derivatives
AR-15 style rifles
Trial and research firearms of the United States